Gorana Matić (born October 24, 1973) is a Croatian tennis player that played for Yugoslavia and Croatia. 

Matić didn't have much success in her career but she is nevertheless important for the history of Croatian tennis. Together with Nadin Ercegović, Maja Murić and Maja Palaveršić she was a member of the original Croatian Fed Cup team in 1992. She also played the first Croatian Fed Cup match which was also the first Croatian international tennis match at representative level.

ITF Circuit finals

Singles: 3 (2–1)

First Croatian international tennis match

External links

Greece vs. Croatia 1992 Federation Cup

1973 births
Living people
Yugoslav female tennis players
Croatian female tennis players